Val de San Lorenzo is a municipality located in the province of León, Castile and León, Spain. According to the 2004 census (INE), the municipality has a population of 674 inhabitants and a density of 12,89 inhabitants/km2.

References

Municipalities in the Province of León
Maragatería